Rangers International Football Club, commonly known as Enugu Rangers, is a Nigerian professional association football team. They are based in Enugu and play their home games at the Nnamdi Azikiwe Stadium. Enugu Rangers are one of the three oldest clubs in Nigeria since their formation in 1970, the other two being Bendel Insurance and Kano Pillars.

They are the only Nigerian team never to have been relegated from the Nigeria Premier League.

History

The 1970s
Enugu Rangers were founded in 1970 and won a nationally organised tournament which allowed them to qualify for the 1971 African Cup of Champions Clubs. Rangers first international tournament ended in defeat in the quarterfinal rounds, losing 0–3 on aggregate to ASEC Mimosas.

They almost achieved instant success in the cup as well, making the final of the first Nigerian FA Cup in 1971, but losing 2–1 to Shooting Stars F.C.

After winning the 1974 double, including a 2–0 cup final win over Mighty Jets, the Enugu players were given promotions at the Nigerian Sports Council and cars.

Rangers lost the 1975 African Cup of Champions Clubs to Guinea's Hafia FC, earning left-back Silvanus Okpalla the nickname "Hafia" for his poor play in the final. Enugu had overturned a 3–1 defeat in Egypt in the semifinal to qualify for the final. Founding Ranger Ernest Ufele retired after the defeat.

International success finally came in 1977. The club, now managed by their first-ever captain Godwin Achebe, had lost several players to Ibo state when the new jurisdiction was created in 1976. In the quarterfinals, they were held to a goalless draw at home by defensively minded ASF Police of Dakar. Twenty minutes into the second half, Rangers took the lead, silencing the Senegal stadium, and won the game 2–1. After the game ended, Nigerian press noted the team was beaten by Senegalese fans, including three stabbed Rangers players. A military plane was flown to Dakar to evacuate the victors.

The 1977 semi-finals set up one of the greatest ties in Nigerian football history as Enugu were drawn against Shooting Stars. Rangers would go on to defeat Canon Yaounde 5–2 on aggregate in the final, including a 4–1 win on Nigerian soil.

During this time period, Rangers boasted a number of Nigerian national team players such as Christian Chukwu, goalkeeper Emmanuel Okala and Aloysius Atuegbu.

The 1980s
Led by coach Christian Chukwu, Enugu won the 1983 Nigerian Cup, defeating DIC Bees of Kaduna 5–4 on penalties after a 0–0 draw.

Rangers won their sixth title in 1984 with a number of players who had led Nigeria to the 1980 African Cup of Nations. Louis Igwilo captained the team.

The 1990s: lean years
Rangers joined the new fully professional league in 1990 and made cup final that year, losing to Stationery Stores on 5–4 on penalty kicks. They would not make another cup final appearance in the decade, and their best league finish was third in 1998.

The 2000s
Enugu topped the table after the 2001 home and away season but finished bottom of the four-team championship playoff group.

Enugu Rangers made the group stage of the 2004 CAF Confederation Cup and missed out on winning the group and making the final after losing a head-to-head tiebreaker to Asante Kotoko. Rangers drew 0–0 against Angola's Petro de Luanda and celebrated, thinking they had advanced on goal difference, but the first tiebreaker was head-to-head.

In the 2005 season, Rangers finished as Runners-up in the league, five points off eventual champions Enyimba.

In 2008–09, they played some games in nearby Abakaliki and Nnewi as their stadium was renovated for the 2009 FIFA U-17 World Cup. Before the season started, Enugu State governor Sullivan Chime paid the backlog of sign-on fees dating to three years ago and all other debts owed the players.

In November 2008, Rangers became the first Nigerian clubside to be a public company and sell ownership stock. However the deal fell through, and the club began the 2009 season in debt. The club is currently owned by the state government.

Enugu did begin a 12-year run of success in a minor trophy, the local state FA Cup, which they won every year from 2005 to 2017.

2016–current: Success again
After a 2015 season which nearly saw them relegated, Enugu won the 2016 Nigeria Premier League, their first championship since 1982. Closest challengers Rivers United needed Enugu to lose on the final day of the season, but Rangers won their game against El-Kanemi Warriors 4–0 to win the championship.

2017 saw Enugu struggle, dropping into the relegation zone halfway through the season. They recovered, finishing 14th and keeping alive their streak of never being relegated from the top flight.

The club went on to won their first Nigerian Cup in 35 years in 2018. Rangers stunned Kano Pillars, coming back from a 3–0 deficit to win the trophy on penalties. Ajani Ibrahim scored on a diving header two minutes into stoppage time to tie the game 3–3. Rangers played in the final five times from 1987 to 2007, never winning once.

In the first championship playoff clash on Wednesday, June 13, 2019, Enugu Rangers defeated FC IfeanyiUbah 4–2 in a six-goal thriller to secure a CAF Confederation Cup ticket.

Many Nigerians remember with fondness watching Enugu Rangers play in the 1970s and 1980s.

Rivalries
Enyimba and Rangers compete in the "Oriental derby."

Honours
Nigeria Premier League: 7
Winners::1974, 1975, 1977, 1981, 1982, 1984, 2016

Nigerian FA Cup: 6
Winners::1974, 1975, 1976, 1981, 1983, 2018

Nigerian Super Cup: 1
Winners::2004

 African Cup of Champions Clubs
Runners-up: 1975

African Cup Winners' Cup: 1
Winners::1977

Performance in CAF competitions
 African Cup of Champions Clubs / CAF Champions League : 10 appearances
The club had 7 appearances in African Cup of Champions Clubs from 1971 to 1985 and 3 appearances in CAF Champions League from 2006 to 2017.

1971 – Quarter-finals
1975 – Finalist
1976 – Semi-finals
1978 – Semi-finals

1982 – Semi-finals
1983 – First Round
1985 – Second Round

2006 – First Round
2013 – Second Round
2017 – First Round

CAF Confederation Cup: 4 appearances
2004 – Group stage
2005 – Intermediate Round
2013 – Intermediate Round
2017 – Playoff Round
2018–19 – Group stage
2019–20 – Group stage

CAF Cup: 2 appearances
1996 – Second Round
2003 – Semi-finals

CAF Cup Winners' Cup: 2 appearances
1977 – Champion
1984 – Quarter-finals

Current first team squad
As of 26 November 2021

Staff
Chairman
 Festus Onu

general manager
 Prince Davidson Owumi

Team Manager
Amobi Ezeaku

Head Coach
 Salisu Yusuf

Chief Coach
 Mbwas Mangut

Physiotherapist
 Adejuyigbe Opeyemi

Assistant Coach I
 John Edeh

Assistant Coach II

Trainer I
 []

Trainer II
 ]

Trainer III
 []

Trainer IV
 []

GoalKeeper Trainer I
 [Victor Okoh]

GoalKeeper Trainer II
 []

Media Officer
 [Norbert Okolie]

Former head coaches
 Daniel Anyiam (1970–72)
 Godwin Achebe (1972–78)
 Roberto Diaz (1980–82)
 Denilson Custodio 1982
 Janusz Kowalik (1983–84)
 Kosta Papić (2002–3)
 Okey Emordi (2008)
 Christian Chukwu (2008 – Aug 09)
 Alphonsus Dike (Sept 2009–11)
 Okey Emordi (Feb 2012 – Oct 13)
 Imama Amapakabo (2015–17)

Notable players
Christian Chukwu
Augustine Azuka "Jay-Jay" Okocha
Emmanuel Okala

References

External links

 
Football clubs in Nigeria
Association football clubs established in 1970
Enugu
1970 establishments in Nigeria
Sports clubs in Nigeria
Unrelegated association football clubs
African Cup Winners Cup winning clubs